Abbenbroek is a village in the Dutch province of South Holland. It is a part of the municipality of Nissewaard, and lies about 6 km west of Spijkenisse.

In 2001, the village of Abbenbroek had 971 inhabitants. The built-up area of the town was 0.22 km², and contained 390 residences. The wider statistical district of Abbenbroek, covering the town and the "Polder Abbenbroek", has a population of around 1350.

Until 1980, Abbenbroek was a separate municipality, when it became part of Bernisse.

The municipal coat of arms is attested in the Beyeren Armorial (c. 1405, fol. 39v). It shows a pair of breeches, reflecting the popular interpretation of the element broek (properly "brook, marshland").

References

Populated places in South Holland
Former municipalities of South Holland
Nissewaard